Job 22 is the 22nd chapter of the Book of Job in the Hebrew Bible or the Old Testament of the Christian Bible. The book is anonymous; most scholars believe it was written around 6th century BCE. This chapter records the speech of Job, which belongs to the Dialogue section of the book, comprising Job 3:1–31:40.

Text
The original text is written in Hebrew language. This chapter is divided into 30 verses.

Textual witnesses
Some early manuscripts containing the text of this chapter in Hebrew are of the Masoretic Text, which includes the Aleppo Codex (10th century), and Codex Leningradensis (1008).

There is also a translation into Koine Greek known as the Septuagint, made in the last few centuries BC; some extant ancient manuscripts of this version include Codex Vaticanus (B; B; 4th century), Codex Sinaiticus (S; BHK: S; 4th century), and Codex Alexandrinus (A; A; 5th century).

Analysis
The structure of the book is as follows:
The Prologue (chapters 1–2)
The Dialogue (chapters 3–31)
The Verdicts (32:1–42:6)
The Epilogue (42:7–17)

Within the structure, chapter 22 is grouped into the Dialogue section with the following outline:
Job's Self-Curse and Self-Lament (3:1–26)
Round One (4:1–14:22)
Round Two (15:1–21:34)
Round Three (22:1–27:23)
Eliphaz (22:1–30)
Job's Offenses (22:1–11)
God's Knowledge and Power (22:12–20)
Urging Job to Repent (22:21–30)
Job (23:1–24:25)
Bildad (25:1–6)
Job (26:1–27:23)
Interlude – A Poem on Wisdom (28:1–28)
Job's Summing Up (29:1–31:40)

The Dialogue section is composed in the format of poetry with distinctive syntax and grammar. Comparing the three cycles of debate, the third (and final) round can be seen as 'incomplete', because there is no speech from Zophar and the speech by Bildad is very short (6 verses only), which may indicate as a symptom of disintegration of the friends' arguments. In his last speech of the book (chapter 22), Eliphaz becomes more direct in his accusation of Job as a sinner, even further than the position of Bildad and Zophar, by confronting Job with a list of alleged offenses (verses 1–11) in contrast to God's knowledge and power (verses 12–20), so at the end Eliphaz urges Job to repent (verses 21–30).

Eliphaz lists Job's offenses (22:1–11)
Although Eliphaz opens his speech with a gentle tone, he soon attacks Job for having a defective piety toward God ("fear of God"), which could be Job's attempt to bribe God into overlooking his real wickedness (verse 4). It is followed by a string of accusations (summary in verse 5, illustrations in verses 6–11) that Job could have sinned, betraying Eliphaz' steep belief in the retribution theology that only great guilt can explain Job's great suffering. Job will specifically denied all of these charges in his oath of clearance in chapter 31.

Verse 4
[Eliphaz said:] "Is it because of your fear of Him that He corrects you,
and enters into judgment with you?"
"Your fear of Him": or "your piety", a reference to Job's reverence to God. The expected answer of the question is that God does not punish Job because he is righteous, but because he must be unrighteous.

Eliphaz urges Job to acknowledge God's knowledge and repent from his sins (22:12–30)
In the first part of this section Eliphaz describes God's majesty (verse 12) to counter what he perceived as Job's claim of God as having limited knowledge and unable to see through deep darkness, so unable to properly judge. Eliphaz concludes that Job must be guilty by association, as he describes the wicked and implies that Job must be like them (verses 15–20). Finally, Eliphaz outlines the way for Job to return to God, that is, beyond the initial returning also to receive instruction (tora or Torah from God and place His words in his heart (verse 22); a good advice which is misdrected – it is Eliphaz that will need to follow it (Job 42:7–9), instead of Job. Eliphaz' tidy analysis and advice are unfortunately based on a misdiagnosis of Job's situation and with this speech, Eliphaz seems to run out of arguments as his part in the dialogue is grinding to a halt (verse 29).

Verse 24

[Eliphaz said:] "Then you will lay up gold as dust,
and the gold of Ophir as the stones of the brooks."
"Gold of Ophir": renowned in the ancient writings as 'very-high-quality gold', although the location of Ophir is debated. An ostracon from 8th century BC mentioning "gold of Ophir" written in Paleo-Hebrew alphabet was found at the archaeological site Tell Qasile near Tel Aviv.

Verse 29
"It is because of pride" in ESV).
"Humble”; in Hebrew literally "the lowly of eyes".

See also

Related Bible parts: Job 21, Job 42

Notes

References

Sources

External links
 Jewish translations:
 Iyov - Job - Chapter 22 (Judaica Press) translation [with Rashi's commentary] at Chabad.org
 Christian translations:
 Online Bible at GospelHall.org (ESV, KJV, Darby, American Standard Version, Bible in Basic English)
 Book of Job Chapter 22. Various versions
  Various versions

22